Yolaine Oddou (born 20 March 1990 in Apprieu, France) is a French-Canadian biathlete who won Canada's woman biathlete of the year (the Myriam Bedard award) in 2009, after winning the junior championships bronze medal and placing 11th in the sprint and 6th in the pursuit for biathlon.

She has competed in the IBU Cup and the World Championships and has been part of Canada's National Development Team for biathlon.

Oddou, who moved to Canada with her family from France in 1999, first tried biathlon while skiing at the Castor Kanik club in Valcatier.

She studied sports at Cégep Garneau. She lives in Haute-Saint-Charles, Quebec.

References

1990 births
Canadian female biathletes
Living people
French emigrants to Canada
Sportspeople from Isère